Crocidura sapaensis is a species of white-toothed shrew native to northern Vietnam. It was first described in 2013 and its specific name derives from the Sa Pa where it was discovered.

Description
Crocidura sapaensis is very similar in appearance to the Hainan Island shrew (Crocidura wuchihensis) and it was only recognised as a separate species in 2013 after molecular analysis. This shows that C. sapaensis is more closely related to the Indochinese shrew (Crocidura indochinensis), however these two species are more morphologically distinct. There may have been convergence between C. wuchihensis and C. sapaensis due to them occupying similar ecological niches.

Crocidura sapaensis is a small shrew with a relatively long tail. Its short fur is a dark greyish-brown colour. The tail is a similar colour but slightly paler underneath. The most significant morphological difference between this species and C. wuchihensis is the structure of the third molar in the lower jaw.

Distribution and habitat
Crocidura sapaensis is found in several different types of habitat in the vicinity of Tram Ton Station of Hoang Lien National Park. These include primary forest with large trees, mixed evergreen forests, clearings, grassy glades and the wooded banks of streams.

Biology
At all times of year, there seem to be more males than females of this species. Pregnant females were found between May and July and the average size of litter was three.

References

Crocidura
Rodents of Vietnam
Mammals described in 2013